The Ella Proctor Herrick House is a historic house in the rural western part of Gloucester, Massachusetts.  The oldest portion of this First Period house was built in the late 17th century; a brick found in the central chimney bears the date 1672.  The left side of the -story center-chimney saltbox shows clear evidence of 17th century construction methods, and includes a rare example of a segmentally arched interior door frame.  The structure to the right of the chimney was added in the 18th century, and there were some early 20th-century additions.  The central chimney is also a 20th-century replacement.

The house was added to the National Register of Historic Places in 1990.

See also
National Register of Historic Places listings in Gloucester, Massachusetts
National Register of Historic Places listings in Essex County, Massachusetts

References

Houses in Gloucester, Massachusetts
Houses on the National Register of Historic Places in Essex County, Massachusetts